5-MeO-DET or 5-methoxy-N,N-diethyltryptamine is a hallucinogenic tryptamine.

Pharmacology
5-MeO-DET inhibits serotonin reuptake with an IC50 value of 2.4 μM and activates 5-HT2A receptors with an EC50 value of 8.11 nM.

Effects
Low dosages (0.5–1 mg) are reported to produce a relaxing body high and mild entheogenic effects. Shulgin reports in TiHKAL that higher dosages (1–3 mg) can produce very unpleasant reactions.

See also 
 5-MeO-DiPT
 5-MeO-DMT
 5-MeO-MiPT
TiHKAL

References

External links 
TiHKAL entry #36
5-MeO-DET entry in TiHKAL • info

Psychedelic tryptamines
Designer drugs
Diethylamino compounds